Rudolf Toussaint (2 May 1891 – 1 July 1968) was a German Army officer. Toussaint saw action in both World Wars. During World War II he was appointed Commissioner of the German army in the office of the Reich Protector of Bohemia and Moravia.

Biography
He was born on 2 May 1891 in Egglkofen. He joined  the Royal Bavarian Army on 21 September 1911 in the rank of Fahnenjunker (cadet). He was commissioned as a Leutnant (second lieutenant) on 25 October 1913 and assigned to the 18th  Royal Bavarian Infantry Regiment. He fought in World War I, where he was wounded, and was awarded the Iron Cross (First Class) and the Iron Cross (2nd class) in 1914. After the war, he remained in the army and, on 1 December 1935 was promoted to Oberstleutnant; on 1 April 1938 he was promoted further to the rank of Oberst (colonel).
From 1 April 1939 till 1941 he served as a military attaché in the German embassy in Rome. After that, he was promoted on 1 October 1941 as Generalmajor and on 1 October 1942 as Generalleutnant.

In September 1943, as General der Infanterie (promoted on 1 September 1943), he became commissioner of the German army in Italy (Bevollmächtigter General der deutschen Wehrmacht in Italien). On 26 July 1944, he was replaced in this position  by SS-Obergruppenführer Karl Wolff and Toussaint became commissioner of the German army in the  office of the Reich Protector of Bohemia and Moravia, replacing  Ferdinand Schaal and, simultaneously, held the position of Commander of the Military District of Bohemia and Moravia. As such, he was the last Nazi commander of Prague. After World War II, he was captured by US troops in Pilsen and, on 19 April 1947, he was transferred into Czechoslovakia, where on 26 October 1948 he was condemned to life imprisonment for the murder of civilians in the Prague uprising.

In 1955, he  agreed to collaborate with Czechoslovak State Security, but the   Central Committee of the Communist Party of Czechoslovakia refused to consent to his release from prison. While still in prison, he provided them information relating to the West German military leaders and political figures. In 1961, as part of an exchange for two communist agents, he was  released to West Germany, where he died in  1968.

Awards
 Iron Cross (1914) 
 2nd Class 
 1st Class
 Prince Regent Luitpold Jubilee Medal
 Bavarian Military Merit Order 4th Class with Swords
 Wound Badge in Black
 Honour Cross of the World War 1914/1918
 Wehrmacht Long Service Award, 4th to 1st Class
 Clasp to the Iron Cross (1939)
 2nd Class
 1st Class
 War Merit Cross 2nd Class with Swords
 War Merit Cross 1st Class with Swords
 Officer Cross of the Order of St Alexander (Bulgaria)
 Commander's Cross of the Order of the Star of Romania (Romania)
 German Cross in Silver

References

External links
 Lexikon der Wehrmacht

1891 births
1968 deaths
Commanders of the Order of the Star of Romania
German Army generals of World War II
Generals of Infantry (Wehrmacht)
German Army personnel of World War I
People from the Kingdom of Bavaria
People from Mühldorf (district)
Protectorate of Bohemia and Moravia
Recipients of the clasp to the Iron Cross, 1st class
Recipients of the Iron Cross (1914), 1st class
Recipients of the Iron Cross (1914), 2nd class
Recipients of the War Merit Cross
Reichswehr personnel